Jean Chartier may refer to:

 Jean Chartier (chronicler) (c. 1385–1464), chronicler of Edmund Beaufort, 2nd Duke of Somerset etc.
 Jean Chartier (painter) (1500–1580)